Gender plays a role in mass media and is represented within media platforms. These platforms are not limited to film, radio, television, advertisement, social media, and video games. Initiatives and resources exist to promote gender equality and reinforce women's empowerment in the media industry and representations. For example, UNESCO, in cooperation with the International Federation of Journalists, elaborated the Gender-sensitive Indicators for Media contributing to gender equality and women's empowerment in all forms of media.

History 
Feminist writers, largely gaining prominence in the 1967s during second wave feminism, began examining the relationship between media and the perpetuation of misogyny and sexism, criticizing the Western canon for providing and promoting an exclusively white male world view. Notable feminists include Betty Friedan, Andrea Dworkin, bell hooks, and Stuart Hall.

These feminists typically perceived gender as a social construct, which is not only reflected in artistic work but also perpetuated by it. Until fairly recently, feminists have mainly directed their studies to gender representations in literature. Recently, a new wave of academic studies focused on gender representations in modern society and culture (such as in the film, advertisement, and cultural industries).

Gender disparity in media careers 
Numbers of women in media professions such as journalism are growing: as of 2018 in the United States, 41.7% of the newsroom employees were women; the proportion of women journalists in online-only news organizations even reached 47.8%. However, the media is and has been statistically dominated by men, who hold the vast majority of power positions. Few women have been in leading positions; they made up only 28.3% of the television news directors and 30.5% of the managing editors. Today, many news organizations are striving for gender parity on their employees. A large number of international institutions and nonprofit organizations are advocating for gender equality in the media workplace. For instance, in 2018, UNESCO supported 42 media institutions and 16 universities to implement policies and strategies on gender equality. In addition, coherent with the strategy to empower women and girls through policy implementation, 31 institutions, community radio stations, and national broadcasters adopted policies on gender equality in media.

The Bechdel test, coined by cartoonist Alice Bechdel and originally created to evaluate popular fiction's representation of women and subsequently adapted to employment in the media professions, shows that a number of women are employed but do not benefit from an equal voice. For example, women in radio are typically hired to cover topics such as weather and culture.

In the video game industry, about half of the gamers are women; their presence, though, is still limited in the production of games. Those who tried to publicly challenge this situation, such as A. Sarkeesian, have been subjected to harassment. There is concern in cinema about the low number of female directors and the difficulties of older actresses to find roles. Women in film also earn 2.5 times less in annual income when compared to men in the same jobs.

A survey conducted by Stacy Smith of the University of Southern California shows that only 7% of directors, 13% of writers, and 20% of producers in film and television are women. According to The Writers Guild, an estimated 17% of screenplays over the last decade were written by women. However, increasing numbers of women work in the media as journalists or directors. Therefore, they deal with topics tightly related to women's needs and tend to provide a positive role for women. The rise in female labor force participation can be due to a number of factors: Anti-discrimination laws, growing international emphasis on women's rights, greater accessibility to education and job opportunities, a breakdown of conventional gender roles, reduced economic reliance on men, and affordable housing. No longer only consumers of media but also contributors to media, they get more involved in decision-making and agenda of activities. This empowerment of women gives them abilities to promote balance in gender representations and avoid stereotypes. Media becomes a suitable ground for expressions and claims. For instance, the project "Enhancing a gender responsive film sector in the Maghreb-Mashreq region"—funded by the European Union under the Med Film Program—has demonstrated that women empowerment in their career enhances the image of women in the audiovisual landscape.

Representations of women 
In a content analysis in 1970, it was suggested that there are four very common stereotypes that women are seen under:
1) A woman's only place is in her home.
2) Women have no ability to make their own decisions or important ones.
3) A man must always protect women as they are dependent on them.
4) Men only see women as housewives and as sexual objects.

Under-representation and misrepresentation 
In spite of their monumental achievements, women's representation in media remains drastically low to that of their male counterparts. Women are the focus of only 10% of news stories, comprise just 20% of experts or spokespeople interviewed, and a mere 4% of news stories are deemed to challenge gender stereotypes. Studies show that men are more likely to be quoted than women in the media, and more likely to cover "serious" topics. Women have been seriously marginalized in certain news categories such as politics, law, and business; only about 30% of the news reports about government refer to women, while less than 20% of the financial news includes female sources. Furthermore, the news media always cites more ordinary opinions from female witnesses or citizens but leaves the majority of insightful statements to men. A central trend in black feminist thinking is challenging media portrayals of black women as mammies, matriarchs, jezebels, welfare mothers, and tragic mulattoes. "These assumptions represent and misrepresent both the ways in which black women perceive themselves (individually and collectively) and the ways in which they are perceived by others," Hudson claims.

According to the report investigation of female characters in popular films across 11 countries, 1 woman for 2.24 men appeared on the screen between 1 January 2010 and 1 May 2013. In 2009, the Screen Actors Guild (US) also found that men continue to make up the majority of roles, especially Supporting Roles, where they contribute around two roles for every female role. In contrast, females hold a slightly larger proportion of lead roles compared to their proportion of supporting roles, but still occupy fewer lead roles than their male counterparts.

The same is true for television programs. In general, from the 1950s to the 1970s, female accounted for 30-35% of the roles in American television programs. This increased in the 1980s, but there were still twice as many roles for men in television. However, these disparities change depending on the type of program: in mid-1970s sitcoms, there were "nearly equal proportions," whereas in action-adventure shows, "only 15 per cent of the leading characters were women." In the 1980s, female characters represented 43% of roles in comedy shows and only 29% in action-adventure programs; however, they had outnumbered male characters two to one in dramas. Since the 1990s, "gender roles on television seemed to become increasingly equal and non-stereotyped ... although the majority of lead characters were still male."

More recently, studies based on computational approaches showed that women speaking time in French TV and radio used to be 25% in 2001 (75% for men) and evolved to 35% in 2018. Women vocal presence was also lower during high audience time-slots.

The Geena Davis Institute on Gender in Media is an organization that has been lobbying the industry for years to expand the roles of women in film.

In the 1960s and 1970s, feminists such as Clare Short, Gaye Tuchman, and Angela McRobbie denounced unfair representations of gender in media and especially in magazines.

Sexualization 
Noticing the fact that women are more likely to be presented by photos rather than words in digital news, Sen Jia and his colleagues argued that women's appearance probably serves for visual pleasure. Besides, mass media has become a driving force to discrimination based on gender. Images and expectations of gender roles are highlighted through a variety of platforms and sources like the structure of language, activities, media, school settings, historical passages or art pieces, and the workplace. Sexualization of women, in particular, is heavily centralized in mass media. When these platforms hyper sexualize women, portray them in a lack of clothing, or depict women as subordinate to men, a women's self esteem, body image, and emotional well being may be negatively affected. One of the earliest studies of role portrayal in advertisement was done in 1971 by Courtney and Lockeretz. These researchers discovered four central themes of female stereotypes: first, a woman's place was in the home; second, women didn't make important decisions; third, women were dependent on their male counterparts; and fourth, women were perceived as sexual objects. Two other follow up studies done by Wagner and Banos, and Belkaoui and Belkaoui reached similar outcomes. The final two points highlight the angle that women are viewed in regards to their sexuality and bodies. For centuries, dating back to when women would pose for paintings or sculptures, the concept that a woman's nature lied within the ground of subordination and submission has been reinforced by media.

The Western ideal of female beauty is that of the fit, young, and thin woman, and the media spreads this ideal through movies, TV shows, fashion shows, advertisements, magazines and newspapers, music videos, and children's cartoons. For women to be considered attractive, they have to conform to images in advertisements, television, and music portraying the ideal woman as tall, white, thin, with a 'tubular' body and blonde hair.

Studies show that typical female roles fall into cultural stereotypes of women and are often sexualized with minimal clothing and sexualized roles. For example, a 2010 content analysis of video games found that "41% of female characters wore revealing clothing and an equal number were partially or totally nude," whereas the male characters were not.  In media platforms such as television and video games, women tend to be underrepresented. In video games, women are often depicted as characters in need of assistance or in positions that are either submissive or helpful. More than 80% of female characters in video game magazines are objectified, under dressed, or observed with charm; more than a fifth fall into all three categories. However, sexualization is not the only stereotypical way in which women are represented in the media.

In advertisement, celebrity endorsement of products are thought to be especially effective if the celebrity is a physically attractive woman, as the attractiveness is thought to transfer to the brand's image and studies have shown that audiences respond better to female endorsements. The idea of sexualization is to give something a sexual role. In the media sexualization gets advertised by companies that are trying to promote something or someone. They don't always promote the equality in gender when they are advertised though it may seem like they do. The sexualization in advertisements may matter to some people but others it may not. "Women showed lower product attractiveness and purchase intentions toward products presented with sexualized female models than with neutral ads, whereas men were unaffected by ads’ sexualization." Studies have shown that men are less likely to buy something based on the sexualization of the advertisement. The women on the other hand based their purchases off of how the ad was presented whether it was showing sexualization or not showing it at all. Some men would purchase products based on the sexualization and how the product was presented with women in it. "Especially men with higher hostile sexism showed more purchase intentions after viewing female sexualized ads than neutral ads." Whereas women would not buy those products due to negative emotions toward the products that advertise the sexualization. It definitely has an impact on the way that women view each other after seeing the ads.

"The ideal female beauty is the fit, young, and thin women that is seen in the media and on tv. Media effects research has confirmed that sexualizing media exposure can negatively affect preteens’ body image and sexual development. While there is a link between sexualizing content and adverse outcomes such as self-objectification and body dissatisfaction, an interest in sexual media content is a normal part of healthy sexual development during the preteen years." As young women watch these shows and movies, they start to worry more about their body image than anything. Some will go as far as even starving themselves to get the right image as the women they see on tv." To what extent do sexual content, appearance-related content, sexual objectification, and objectification occur in Flemish preteens’ favorite TV shows? And how are these different types of content related to gender roles? Seeking to address these questions, this article reports on a quantitative content analysis of 24 episodes from five TV shows popular among Flemish preteens."

Objectification of women in the media is transmitted verbally and nonverbally, as well as directly and indirectly. Objectification is not only visual, but can also be expressed subtly by commenting on women's appearance in a humorous way, making jokes and gags, and using double meanings. To advocate against the objectification of women in the media, some programs are implementing projects on this issue. For instance, some trainings and handbooks are being developed by International organizations and nonprofit organizations for media professionals to improve the gender-sensitivity of media representations.

Some shows focused entirely on successful professional women and their "quests for sex, pleasure and romantic love," such as Ally McBeal (1997–2002) and Sex and the City (1998–2004). Even if the main character in Ally McBeal was portrayed as desperate to find a husband, the show had other non-stereotypical female characters and "sided with the women."  Sex and the City had assertive female protagonists, especially in matters of sex, and did not punish them for wanting pleasure, knowing how to get it, and being determined to do so, which can be seen especially in the case of Samantha Jones, played by Kim Cattrall. Another female icon from the 1990s is Buffy Summers, the title character on Buffy the Vampire Slayer, who was portrayed as powerful, heroic, confident, and assertive, characteristics that were generally ascribed to male characters.

In her 1973 article "Visual Pleasure and Narrative Cinema," feminist film critic Laura Mulvey coined the term male-gaze to describe the way that women in film serve as projections of male fantasies.

Domestication 
Women are often portrayed in traditional roles in advertisements and television. Television shows have often portrayed marriage, parenthood, and domesticity as more important to women than men. From the mid-1940s to the 1960s, women (predominantly white, middle-class women) were portrayed mostly as housewives who had seemingly "perfect" lives: their houses were always impeccably clean, their children were always healthy, and they were always beautiful and organized. TV didn't portray the reality that by 1960, "40 per cent of women worked outside the home ... [and that] divorce rates spiked twice after World War II". According to a study from 1975 conducted by Jean McNeil, in 74 per cent of the cases studied, women's interactions were "concerned with romance or family problems", whereas men's interactions were concerned with these matters in only 18 per cent of the cases. Furthermore, female characters often didn't have jobs, especially if they were wives and mothers, and were not the dominant characters or decision-makers. The boss is usually a man. Men are portrayed as more assertive or aggressive, adventurous, active, and victorious, while women are shown as passive, weak, ineffectual, victimized, supportive, and laughable.

On television, women more frequently play the role of the housekeeper and men more frequently play the roles of professionals. As a reflection of the real world, same stories have happened in the news media. Women are overrepresented as students and homemakers while underrepresented in most other occupations. Even for professional women, their feminine attributes are emphasized in news coverage relating them to topics including age, appearance, and family-career balance. Sports news tended to focus on female athletes' look and personal lives instead of their capabilities and career development. Hanne Vandenberghe, a researcher at KU Leuven, found very similar patterns in news reporting outstanding women in government agencies and the technology industry.

In another study, Souha R. Ezzedeen found that career-driven female characters in film were negatively represented as having conniving personalities, being isolated, and being unable to balance work and family. While 40+ male roles are on the rise in both theatrical and television productions, female 40+ roles represent only 28% of female roles. Actors such as Harrison Ford and Clint Eastwood continue to undertake major roles as ageless heroes, whereas the normative structure for older women is that their aging is part of the plot (for example in Mamma Mia! (2008) and Sex and the City (2010)). This is typically seen in relation to female roles relying on sexualization, and the superficial (apparent) effects of aging on their body are presented as something to be hidden. They continue to be defined mainly by their appearance. In gossip culture, the older female body is represented in largely negative terms unless it has been modified "correctly" by cosmetic surgery. Aging female celebrities have become one of the mainstays of gossip magazines and blogs, which endorse a culture of consumption in which cosmetic technologies and procedures are not questioned but in which female celebrities who have used them are either figured as glamorous for getting it right or as monstrous for going too far. Another consequence of portraying aging women in the media, is that in most TV shows, actresses who are playing characters in their 40s and 50s tend to have younger appearing body types. This has led to critiques that these representations are first and foremost framed in terms of how well older actresses are managing their aging bodies. Midlife women have grown accustomed to seeing their age group portrayed in a seemingly unrealistic way, and this had led to an increase of eating disorders and negative body image among this group.

In one court case in 2011, English television actress Miriam O'Reilly successfully sued the BBC for age discrimination after being dropped from a show. It was claimed that she had been told to be careful about her wrinkles and to consider Botox and dyeing her hair.

The commercial potential of older consumers is becoming more significant (an increased 'active lifespan', the baby boom generation entering retirement, retirement ages that are raising). A multiplication of images of successful aging are explicitly tied to consumerism by the anti-ageing industry and older female celebrities advertising their products. Examples abound: Sharon Stone for Christian Dior, Catherine Zeta-Jones for Elizabeth Arden, Diane Keaton and Julianna Margulies for L'Oreal, Christy Turlington for Maybelline, Ellen DeGeneres for CoverGirl, etc. These advertisements are paradoxical in that they allow older celebrities to remain visible while encouraging an ageist and sexist culture in which women are valued for their appearance. Baby boomers are an increasingly important audience group for the cinema industry, resulting in more and new kinds of stories with older protagonists. Romantic comedies in which women protagonists take on the romantic heroine role provide one of the few spaces in popular culture showing appealing representations of older women, such as I Could Never Be Your Woman (2007), Last Chance Harvey (2008), and It's Complicated (2009). They are part of a phenomenon called the "Girling" of older women, where the protagonists and celebrities are portrayed as being just as excited and entitled to be going out on dates as younger women.

Abuse 
Heterosexual romantic relationships in media, particularly in film, often romanticize intimate partner violence wherein the woman is the victim. Film like Once Were Warriors (1994) is an example of film in which abusive behavior, such as manipulation, coercion, threats, control and domination, isolation, excessive jealousy, and physical violence, are all exhibited by the male romantic lead. A 2016 study on women's interpretations of abusive behavior found that many women see the sort of abusive behaviors shown in popular films as romantic or desirable. In Netflix's popular hit show, "You," the male main character justifies and romanticizes stalking, emotional manipulation, and even murder as his way of protecting his one true love. This conflation of abuse and romance is widely attributed to the prevalence of abusive tropes in popular media.

Female characters as plot devices for male characters

Referred Pain
In media featuring a male protagonist, women's pain, suffering, or even death are often used as plot devices to further the male protagonist's narrative arc. This is known as the “referred pain” plot device. It involves a situation wherein a woman undergoes a traumatic event, often (but not always) of a sexual nature, but her pain is referred to a male character. This male character's grief and anger due to the trauma experienced by the female character are explored in depth.  The female character's emotional or physical response is only addressed briefly or cursorily. This trope is featured in such films as Mission: Impossible 2 (2000), Moulin Rouge (2001), as well as in the Shakespeare play Titus Andronicus and books like Oroonoko.

Disposable Woman

The Disposable Woman trope refers to a trope in which a woman is included in a story for the sole purpose of dying, thus putting the male protagonist through emotional development or inspiring him to embark on a revenge quest. The woman who dies in these situations is referred to as "disposable" because she does not serve a purpose beyond her death. The disposable woman trope in present in many films, including Braveheart (1995), The Matrix Revolutions (2003), The Bourne Supremacy (2004), The Dark Knight (2008), The Amazing Spider-Man 2 (2014), Deadpool 2 (2018), and Avengers: Infinity War (2018).

The Manic Pixie Dream Girl 
The term "Manic Pixie Dream Girl" was coined in 2007 by film critic Nathan Rabin to describe a female character who exists solely "to teach broodingly soulful young men to embrace life and its infinite mysteries and adventures." The Manic Pixie Dream Girl improves the life of the male protagonist and makes him a happier and better person, but she has no apparent character arc or complex story; she is simply a plot device. A list of notable instances of the Manic Pixie Dream Girl trope can be found on the article for Manic Pixie Dream Girl.

Damsel in Distress 
Damsel in distress serves as a character in trouble who needs the assistance of a male character to get over her problems.  In the “Snow White and the Seven Dwarfs”, after being fatally poisoned by her step mother, Snow White’s seven dwarf friends mourn her death, “until a handsome prince restores her to life with a kiss.” Many of Disney’s fairy tale movies, portray the princesses as damsels in distress, whilst enhancing their male protagonists’ masculinity, as they rescue these princesses. They are further cleaved to the stereotype of only yearning to find their true love. Similarly with the story of “The Sleeping Beauty” where a beautiful princess cursed to sleep, can only be woken up by her true love’s kiss. Even though the story gets its name from the princess, she is helpless and needs a “sword-wielding prince, bursting with testosterone, who chops his way through the forest” to kiss and wake her up from her sleep.

The Item Girl 
Mostly popular in Bollywood cinema, the Item girl is “the sexist representation of women subjected to the male gaze.” The 1970’s introduced Item numbers to Bollywood, which is still prevalent today. Actresses who dance to item numbers usually make guest appearances, and aren’t crucial to the story. An item girl dances her way “trying to get through the main lead’s heart with their piercing eyes and body movements, trying to hypnotize everyone watching them.”

 Actress Helen’s dance to ‘Mehbooba’ and ‘Ae Mera Dil’ in ‘Sholay’ is an example of an item number.
 Actress Malaika Arora rose to fame with her performance in Chaiyya Chaiyya in 1998, Anarkali Disco Chali in 2012, and her performance in Munni Badnam in 2010.
 Actress Mallika Sherawat in Jalebi Bai in 2011 was considered an iconic sex symbol in Bollywood.
 Nora Fatehi is the recent face for the Bollywood Item Numbers, appearing in many Bollywood movies as the item girl. Some of her numbers include, Dilbar in 2018, O Saki Saki in 2019, Garmi in 2020, Kusu Kusu in 2021.

These women are portrayed as desirable, dancing among a crowd of men at a party, while the male protagonists and antagonists lust over and dances with them. In the song “Aao Raja'' in Gabbar is back with Akshay Kumar and Chitrangada Singh, the item number helps enable the protagonist to continue their plot and seek revenge against the lustfully distracted antagonist.

The representation of an item girl reiterates the cultural image of women as ornamental objects whose principal role is to look good and please men and the male gaze.

Women leads as secondary characters 
Bollywood has made many women empowerment movies that fail to portray strong female characters as the main leads and protagonists, and instead provide a male protagonist with a motivation to resolve and fix the issues, when he sees the female characters struggle with such issues. Many of Bollywood's 'feminist' or 'women empowerment' movies assert the Male Savior trope, pushing females to serve as secondary characters, in movies addressing 'their' issues.

 The 2007 movie, “Chak De India” features a bickering women’s hockey team, that is led by coach Shah Rukh Khan, to rebuild their chemistry and win the World Championship. Something they weren’t capable of until his entry.
 The 2018 movie “Padman” with Akshay Kumar is about a man who takes it upon himself to build a machine to create low cost sanitary pads, and distribute it among poor and underprivileged women throughout India at low prices. This movie addresses period poverty, and the high prices of female sanitary products. The male protagonist's motivation is his wife, who refuses to buy the expensive pads, and instead wears unsanitary clothes during her menstrual cycle. In many Bollywood movies, women’s issues serve as plot points for male characters to be built around.

The Devoted Wife 
The “devoted wife” is the trope where a wife is dedicated to her husband, ignoring his poor behavior, absence and infidelity. She stays in the marriage with her cheating and rebellious husband, as her loyalty serves as a redemption arc for the male protagonist. This is a trope that is mostly popular among Bollywood movies, affirming to the societal expectation that divorce is unacceptable as “family is above the individual” and that women must be accepting of their husbands, even in their worst flaws and continue to stay in oppressive marriages.

In the 1997, Raja Ki Aayegi Baarat, a woman is forced to marry her rapist, and the abuse continues on after the marriage. She serves as the devoted wife, turning a blind eye to her husband's abuse, while raising a voice against abuse by her husband's family. This movie portrays this trope the best, reinforcing the negative narrative on divorce.

Representations of men 
Men are proportionally represented by media more often compared to women, and these portrayals often draw on sexist stereotypes. Male characters in film and television are typically more tough, aggressive, domineering, etc. than the average man they are meant to represent.

Media often plays a role in the acceptance of negative values as the perceived norm for men and masculinity.

Masculinity is a set of ideas related to the behavior and appearance of men and boys. Some argue that most societies socialize men and boys to assume that they are superior, leader, aggressive and entitled. According to the hegemonic masculinity model of gender studies, men who demonstrate power, strength, bravery, fearlessness, virility, competitiveness etc.. can assert their (supposed) superiority over women and consolidate their general position of dominance over them (physically, intellectually, and sexually).

Media representations of sports and athletes contribute to the construction of a dominant model of masculinity centered on strength and an ambivalent relationship to violence, encouraging boys and men to take risks and to be aggressive.

The UNESCO's section for Media Development and Society advocates for gender equality in sports media. "Sports coverage is hugely powerful in shaping norms and stereotypes about gender. Media has the ability to challenge these norms, promoting a balanced coverage of men's and women's sports and a fair portrayal of sportspeople – irrespective of gender". The campaign "Her Moments Matter" highlighted the fact that biased media representations of sports athletes have repercussions on women's self-confidence and the perception they have of themselves.

Advertisements often use male actors when promoting alcoholic beverages, banking services, or credit cards. When men are acting on a television commercial, they are usually performing activities such as playing sports, driving around girls, repairing cars, drinking, relaxing, and having fun. Advertisements for cars are often highly dependent on the sexuality of women actors, but not for male actors.

Also, when a man is promoting on an advertisement, they usually speak about the product and do not use it. They seem to be the beneficiary of the product or service, typically performed by women.

Film historian Miriam Hansen argues the way female gaze came to film during the flapper films of the 1920s, specifically citing the famous Italian-American actor Rudolph Valentino as having been used on the screen to draw in a female audience as an embodiment of male beauty.

Representations of transgender and non-binary characters 

In 1985, a U.S. non-governmental media monitoring organization called GLAAD was founded by Vito Russo, Jewelle Gomez, and Lauren Hinds with the support of other LGBT people in the media to combat media discrimination. The name "GLAAD" had been an acronym for "Gay & Lesbian Alliance Against Defamation," but is also known for its inclusivity of bisexual and transgender people.

While sexually diverse representations of people (including transgender and non-binary people) have been growing steadily in recent years, many fictionalized media representations of trans and non-binary characters are created or produced by cisgender writers. Many of these portrayals attempt to adhere to a narrative that requires a trans character to desire to present as “passable” in order to legitimize or validate their experience as “authentic”. Emphasizing the notion of passing perpetuates internalized gender expectations, resulting in a growing pressure to conform to the male gaze and what is acceptable and "passable" media representations, especially in the transfeminine community. This reinforcement of sex and gender norms is also apparent in many representations of transgender men in various media sources from magazine covers to movies and television series to social media. Each of these binarized views of gender implies that to be transgender means to transition from one end of the gender binary to the other, leaving little room for ambiguity when it comes to gender non-conformity and non-binary representations.

There is also an essentialist aspect of the narrative of desired binary-passing as a form of authenticity in that it provides an exceedingly narrow example of the many varied lived experiences of transgender individuals. In concentrating on this singular type of narrative, there is potential for media representations of gender non-conforming people who do not fit neatly into either binary category of male or female to be inadequate. In light of this, there are increasingly more depictions of non-binary, genderfluid, and genderless characters in mainstream television shows like Syd (played by Sheridan Pierce) in One Day at a Time, Crowley (played by David Tennant) in Good Omens, and Janet (played by D’Arcy Carden) in The Good Place, among a growing number of others.

Many mainstream representations of transgender and non-binary people or characters have been portrayed by cisgender actors, such as Hilary Swank’s portrayal of Brandon Teena in Boys Don’t Cry (1999) and Eddie Redmayne’s portrayal of Lili Elbe in The Danish Girl (2015),  leading to some controversy surrounding the ethics of who should be acting the parts of trans and non-binary characters. There has also been some concern raised regarding the sensationalization or “trendiness” of transgender roles as having the potential to be exploited. Despite this, however, there are efforts being made to ensure that trans and non-binary actors are the ones being chosen to play trans and non-binary characters. Some notable examples of this are Laverne Cox’s portrayal of Sophia Burset who is a trans woman in Orange is the New Black, Asia Kate Dillon playing Taylor Mason who is non-binary in Billions, and Sara Ramírez who identifies as bisexual and non-binary and portrays the bisexual, non-binary character of Kat Sandoval in Madam Secretary.

While still marginal in numbers, there is also progress being made toward some more mainstream development of television shows created by trans and non-binary writers, such as Transparent by Joey Soloway. There are many more grassroots level efforts to produce positive transgender and non-binary representation, such as crowdfunded projects like Jen Richards’ and Laura Zak's online web series Her Story.

Gender expectations
Gender expectations are stereotypes about how men and women should behave in a society. Social expectations develop the minds of youth as it guides them to society's ideals of socialization, social morals and values, and gender roles.

Media 
The media can be a source of gender expectations as it stereotypes individuals and groups based on specific genders and sexual preferences. Men are often portrayed as adventurous, dominant, and sexually aggressive, while women tend to be portrayed as young, beautiful, emotionally passive, dependent, and sometimes unintelligent.

In Western media, women are expected to value youth, sexuality, and beauty, while men are taught to value dominance and power. A 2020 study of children's television found that television programs aimed at younger boys tend to promote stereotypically masculine behavior, and that male characters in such programs are more likely to reflect such norms and lack onscreen parents.

Music 
In the documentary film Gaga: Five Foot Two, American singer Lady Gaga states that industry creates expectations for female artists to illustrate to the world. As she explains, "the methodology that I used to get out of that category was when they wanted me to be sexy or they wanted me to be pop; I always put some absurd spin on it that made me feel like I was still in control." Taylor Swift has shared similar comments in her documentary Miss Americana, in which many women musicians in this industry battle with the media scrutiny and toxic media culture in their daily lives, as they must be perceived as perfect and beautiful at all times.

Video games 
Gender expectations are highly incorporated into the character's gender in video games, where the male gaze is dominant.

Female characters are frequently portrayed as a damsel in distress, which objectifies them and relegates the narrative role to a male protagonist. For example, Princess Peach appears in fourteen of the main Super Mario series and is kidnapped in all but one of them, to be rescued by Mario, though she plays a more central role in spinoff media. Where female characters have a major role in the narrative, they tend to be highly sexualized.

Effects on youth

Stereotypes
The media is generally regarded as playing an important role in defining prevailing social norms concerning sexual harassment, especially television, which is "widely accessible and intentionally appealing and engaging, [making] massive use of stereotypical messages that the majority of the people can easily understand". Media affects behaviors and is "of prime importance for adolescents' general ideas of romance, sex, and relationships". Thus, media has important social consequences, among which is greater acceptance of stereotypical attitudes.

In the U.S., for example, exposure to TV has been associated with "more stereotypical sexual attitudes [like the idea that men are sex-driven and the notion that women are sexual objects] and evaluation styles". Also popular is the idea that appearance or sexiness is essential for men and women. Additionally, pop music and music videos have been shown to increase stereotypical gender schemas, and promote the ideas that gender relationships are adversarial and that appearance is fundamental.

The stereotyped portrayals of men and women have been argued to be valued and internalized by younger viewers, especially during puberty and the construction of their sexual identity.

Advertising 

Gender norms are created and emphasized even at an early age through the use of visual cues which has been proven to greatly affect a child's interpretation of gender. Studies using "the gender content in an ad-- characters, products, settings, role portrayals, peripheral cues (colors, language, voice-over)" have proven that a higher degree of gender flexibility has a positive correlation with children's attitudes when viewing advertisements with gender content which conveys the significance of the effects of media in advertising towards youth.

In the 1940s, companies began differentiating their marketing based on gender to broaden their sales and create a completely separate line of products that would be purposed for solely either a boy or a girl. These products fostered intellectual development; however, with the new gendered division of toys came the reinforcement of masculine and feminine ideals as well as a clear pink and blue colored divide. "Girl" products such as dolls and makeup foster a passive attitude and put emphasis on striving for beauty while "boy" products such as action figures and cars foster a more aggressive and active characterization. A significance behind toys is the initiation of the learning of new skills and even the initiation of curiosities behind professions. As manufacturers begin to shift towards creating a more inclusive environment and creating non-gendered products, the emergence of more gender neutral toys, dolls, and colors that puts more emphasis on personal interests instead of gender ideals is on the rise.

Television 
Gender-related content has been portrayed in stereotypical ways in advertising, commercials on multiple platforms, and in Television shows.

Writer Christina Bacchilega in her book "Postmodern Fairy Tales," stated “Snow White” is a patriarchal frame that takes "two women’s beauty as the measure of their (self)worth, and thus defines their relationship as a rivalry."  In response, Academic Abigail Gurvich, in her paper, "Gender Roles as taught by Fairy Tales," states that "Snow White" could teach children  that "their only worth is their appearance, and that a less attractive woman is a rival who will want to hurt them; the story enforced the ideas in the girls of the time that the only things that mattered were appearance and innocence. These are two traits that led to Snow White getting her happy ending." Fairytales continue to teach children about norms that could be harmful concerning values and self-image.

Film Genres 
At a young age, both girls and boys tend to direct their interests towards different film categories. Boys tend to prefer action movies, while girls tend to prefer films that contain a female protagonist.

Body image 
In a 1997 Psychology Today survey, "of 3,452 women who responded... 23% indicated that movie or television celebrities influenced their body image when they were young, and 22% endorsed the influence of fashion magazine models". Some women undergoing cosmetic surgeries request specific body parts from celebrities (such as Kim Kardashian's eyes and jawline).

Body dissatisfaction and disordered eating behaviors have increased in the UK, Australia, and the US due to a "perceived environmental pressure to conform to a culturally-defined body and beauty ideal" which is promoted mainly by the media. This ideal of unrealistic and artificial female beauty is "impossible for the majority of females to achieve".

Factors involved in the composition of self-image include the emotional, physical, and reasoning aspects of a person, and these aspects affect one another.

One contributor to negative body image is the promotion of the "thin ideal" in media like commercials and magazines. From seeing images of women with extremely thin bodies, some people have an increase of negative emotions, and these individuals tend to take actions like dieting to help relieve the undesirable feelings about their body image. This act of dieting could lead to dangerous behaviors such as eating disorders if the negative perceptions about one's body image does not improve. Considering that an average North American will watch about 35,000 commercials a year, it is to be expected that commercials presenting images of skinny and gorgeous women will have a bigger impact on increasing negative body image than ads in magazines.

Although media's effect on body image has been historically primarily researched for the female gender, there have been increasingly more studies on males. The masculine ideal of a "lean, muscular mesomorphic body type" represents a minuscule portion of the population that is drastically different than the average which results in increased body dissatisfaction (Agliata & Tantleff-Dunn, 2004) and low self confidence in physical attractiveness and muscle satisfaction (Hargreaves & Tiggemann, 2009). The reason for this causal relationship can be attributed towards Social Comparison Theory (Festinger, 1954) where individuals value themselves based on their performance in comparison to environmental others and Cultivation Theory (Gerbner 1969) which internalizes exposure towards the ideals presented in media.

For the LGBT population, there has been minimal research due to cisgender studies being the primary targets; however, studies have shown that LGBT youth are more likely to exhibit high body image issues than cisgender and heterosexual individuals, given that the timeline for eating disorders and body image dissatisfaction is initiated during adolescence which has a large correlation with the development of sexual orientation. Although the media causes a higher negative impact towards the LGBT population, media has also been proven to be less likely to feature gay individuals due to the "Marketer's Dilemma" in which companies don't want to diminish from the straight consumer base.

Social media 
Throughout the world, feminine and masculine ideals are construed through both the social and cultural environment. The emergence of social media creates a consumer motivation towards rapid growth in entertainment, socializing, information sharing, self-expression, and status representation resulting in both negative and positive effects.

In the chapter of "Gender" from How the World Changed Social Media, the negative effects found through all nine field sites of their study foster the enforcement of gender stereotypes. For example, Southeast Turkey consists of a predominantly Muslim community in which modesty and purity are the values for women, so this population omits featuring life that does not adhere to those ideals; because social media is particularly prone to analysis, both male and females present gender segregated and conforming posts on their pages. Similarly, in rural China, it is custom for women to delete their social medias after marriage or create a portrait of traditional family and romantic values for both men and women. In Italy, the content of men's pages consist of masculine content: "politics, news, powerful motorcycles and sports" while women place emphasis on feminine content: "roles as wives and mothers". In almost every region, this chapter conveys a feminine ideal of family values and physical aesthetic while the masculine ideal is more individualized and material; however, it has also created new opportunity for the expansion of communication, female access to novel career paths, and access to the external world in the same examined regions.

There was a 115% increase in the number of cosmetic surgeries between 2000 and 2018, possibly because social media distorts how teenagers see themselves, and many surgeons report that looking better in selfies on social media posts is an incentive for patients. 

Social media has been used to promote political stances, such as in the referendum to appeal Ireland's eighth amendment. In this case, gender issues were brought to the forefront of social media as a way to transgress politics and push traditionally private female issues into the public. With feminist grassroots organizations, such as Together For Yes, using social media as their primary tool to communicate about abortion laws, the referendum result is viewed as victory for feminist tweeters and a positive outcome of using gender effectively on social media.

Responses and movements for change

Feminist response 
In the 1970s, TV critics, academics, and women started to point out the way TV shows portrayed female characters. TV Guide magazine called out the industry for "refusing to rise above characterizations of women as pretty, skinny, dopey, hapless housewives or housewife wannabes", and a poll conducted by Redbook magazine in 1972 showed that "75 per cent of 120,000 women agreed that 'the media degrades women by portraying them as mindless dolls'". In that sense, The Mary Tyler Moore Show was a television breakthrough because it introduced the first female character whose central relationships were not her husband or boyfriend or her family, but her friends and coworkers. The main character was a sort of stand-in for the "new American female" who put her job before romance and preferred to be alone than with the wrong men, but still had to do stereotypically female office work (like typing and getting coffee) and didn't speak up to her boss and other male coworkers.

Germaine Greer, Australian-born author of The Female Eunuch (1970), offered a systematic deconstruction of ideas such as womanhood and femininity, arguing that women are forced to assume submissive roles in society to fulfill male fantasies of what being a woman entails.  Greer wrote that women were perceived as mere consumers benefiting from the purchasing power of their husband. Women become targets for marketing, she said, and their image is used in advertising to sell products.  American socialist writer and feminist, Sharon Smith wrote on the first issue of Women and Film that women's roles in film "almost always [revolve] around her physical attraction and the mating games she plays with the male characters" in contrast to men's roles, which according to the author are more varied. In 1973 Marjorie Rosen, an important contributor to feminist film theory, argued that "the Cinema Woman is a Popcorn Venus, a delectable but insubstantial hybrid of cultural distortions". In 1978 Gaye Tuchman wrote of the concept of symbolic annihilation, blaming the media for imposing a negative vision of active women and making an apologia for housewives.

From media representations, feminists paved the way for debates and discussions about gender within the social and political spheres. In 1986, the British MP Clare Short proposed a bill to ban newspapers from printing Page 3 photographs of topless models.

In the early 2000s, feminist critics began analyzing film in terms of the Bechdel test. This feminist assessment of cinema was named after Alison Bechdel, feminist cartoonist and creator of the long-running comic strip Dykes to Watch Out For. This test determines the level of gender equality present in a film by assessing whether a work of fiction features at least two named women who talk to each other about something other than a man.

International Organization and Response from Nonprofit Organizations

UN Women 
UN Women is the UN organization dedicated to gender equality and the empowerment of women. To increase women's leadership, to end violence against women and to engage women in all aspects of peace and security processes, it's important to give women the right place in media landscape, and their representations must be fair and equal. UN Women supports media monitoring studies on how women are depicted in the media. For instance, the organization engage media professionals by raising awareness of gender equality and violence against women, including through special workshops and tool-kits, to encourage gender-sensitive reporting."

UNESCO 
In line with UNESCO's Global Priority Gender, "UNESCO is contributing to achieving full gender equality in the media by 2030". To reach this goal, the Organization developed the Gender-sensitive Indicators for Media (GSIM) to measure gender awareness and portrayal within media organizations (e.g. working conditions), but particularly in editorial content. The Organization has been promoting their application by governments, media organizations, journalists unions and associations, journalism schools and the like. They set the basis for gender equality in media operations and editorial content. In addition, each year, UNESCO organizes a campaign named "Women Make the News"; in 2018 the theme was Gender Equality and Sports Media as "Sports coverage is hugely powerful in shaping norms and stereotypes about gender. Media has the ability to challenge these norms, promoting a balanced coverage of men's and women's sports and a fair portrayal of sportspeople irrespective of gender."

Nonprofit Organizations 
Some nonprofit organizations specialize in issues related to gender and media. These include:

- The Geena Davis Institute

- International Women's Media Foundation

See also
 Ageing studies
 Exploitation of women in mass media
 Femininity in advertising 
 Gender representation in video games
 Himbo
 Portrayal of women in comics
 Bisexual literature
 Language and gender

References

Further reading

  Pdf. Introduction to a special issue of Gender and Language focusing on the media
 
 Geena Davis Institute on Gender in Media
 

Gender and entertainment
Sexism
Mass media issues
Social constructionism